Hot Together is the title of the twelfth studio album by the Pointer Sisters released in October 1986 by RCA Records.

History
The eighth of the group's nine collaborations with producer Richard Perry, Hot Together represented a downturn in the Pointer Sisters' fortunes. The lead single, "Goldmine", charted well on Billboard's R&B and dance charts but only reached #33 on the Hot 100. A second single, the ballad "All I Know Is the Way I Feel", reached #93 on the Hot 100. A third release, "Mercury Rising", only managed an appearance on Billboard's R&B chart. The album's title track is more well-known, having been included in the soundtrack for the Mel Brooks' 1987 film Spaceballs and the Richard Dreyfuss 1987 film Stakeout; it was also a part of the NBA's late 1980s promotional campaign.  Other songs of note include "Set Me Free" (co-written by "Neutron Dance" scribe Allee Willis and featured in the opening scene of Whoopi Goldberg's 1986 film Jumpin' Jack Flash) and "My Life" (co-written by actress/comedian Sandra Bernhard). The album was remastered and issued on CD, with bonus tracks, in 2011 by Big Break Records.

Track listing

Personnel 

The Pointer Sisters
 Ruth Pointer – lead vocals (1, 2, 8, 9), backing vocals
 June Pointer – lead vocals (3, 4, 6, 9), backing vocals
 Anita Pointer – lead vocals (5, 7, 9, 10), backing vocals

Musicians
 David P. Bryant – synthesizers (1), drum machine (1)
 Paul Fox – synthesizers (1, 2, 5, 9, 10), drum machine (1, 5, 9, 10), additional synthesizers (3, 4, 8), synth solo (6), horn arrangements (5), tom tom (6)
 Andy Goldmark – synthesizers (2, 3), drum machine programming  (2, 3), arrangements (3)
 Bobby Khozouri – synthesizers (2), drum machine programming (2), additional synthesizers (3)
 Fred Zarr – synthesizers (2)
 Billy Cobin – additional synthesizers (2, 3), drum machine programming (2)
 Jerry Ragovoy – acoustic piano (4), synthesizers (4), drum machine (4)
 Glen Ballard – synthesizers (5, 10), drum machine (5, 10)
 Chuck Wild – synthesizers (5, 10), drum machine (5, 10), additional synthesizers (9), synth solo (9)
 Rick Chudacoff – synthesizers (6), arrangements (6)
 Bill Cuomo – synthesizers (6)
 Sharon Robinson – synthesizers (6), arrangements (6)
 Mike Lawler – synthesizers (7)
 Jeff Lorber – additional synthesizers (7), drum machine (7)
 Danny Sembello – synthesizers (8), drum machine (8)
 Danny Ironstone – additional synthesizers (8)
 Allee Willis – synthesizers (8), drum machine (8), arrangements (8)
 John Van Tongeren – additional synthesizers (10)
 Paul Jackson Jr. – guitar (1-4, 6, 9)
 Paul Pesco – guitar (2, 3)
 Howie Rice – guitar (3), additional synthesizers (7, 9)
 Dennis Herring – lead guitar (4, 9), guitar (5)
 Jimmy English – guitar (7)
 Robbie Nevil – lead guitar (7)
 Larry Treadwell – guitar (8)
 Nathan East – bass guitar (3)
 Bruce Roberts – drum machine programming (2)
 Merv De Peyer – drum machine (4)
 Peter Bunetta – drum machine (6), arrangements (6)
 Dennis Holt – drum machine (7)
 Paulinho da Costa – percussion (1, 2, 3, 5, 6)
 Jimmy Maelen – percussion (2)
 Lenny Castro – percussion (10)

Production 
 Producer – Richard Perry 
 Associate Producers – David P. Bryant (Track 1); Paul Fox (Tracks 1, 5, 9 & 10); Andy Goldmark (Tracks 2 & 3); Bruce Roberts (Tracks 2 & 3); Jerry Ragovoy (Track 4); Glen Ballard (Tracks 5 & 10); Chuck Wild (Tracks 5 & 10); Peter Bunetta and Rick Chudacoff (Track 6); Michael D. Stewart and Dan E. Williams (Track 7); Allee Willis (Track 8); 
 A&R Coordinator – Marge Meoli
 Production Coordinator – Bradford Rosenberger
 Recording Engineer – Michael Brooks 
 Basic Track Recording – Frances Buckley (Tracks 1 & 9); Hugo Dwyer (Track 4); Mick Guzauski (Track 6); Randy Holland (Track 7); Danny Sembello (Track 8).
 Second Engineer – Jay Willis
 Additional Engineering – Frances Buckley, Glen Holguin, Steve Peck and Jay Willis.
 Assistant Engineers – David Dubow, Glen Holguin, Kraig Miller, Barbara Milne, Rich Slater and Glenn Walker.
 Recorded at Studio 55, Conway Studios and Music Grinder (Los Angeles, CA); Unique Recording Studios and Counterpoint Recording Studios (New York, NY).
 Remixed by Bill Bottrell at Studio 55.
 Mastered by Stephen Marcussen at Precision Lacquer (Hollywood, CA).
 Alet Direction and Design – John Kosh and Ron Larson
 Photography – Randee St. Nicholas 
 Management – Gallin Morrey Associates

Charts

References

External links
 

1986 albums
The Pointer Sisters albums
Albums produced by Richard Perry
RCA Records albums